Stanisław Podgórski (7 May 1905 – 15 May 1981) was a Polish cyclist. He competed in the tandem event at the 1928 Summer Olympics.

References

External links
 

1905 births
1981 deaths
Polish male cyclists
Olympic cyclists of Poland
Cyclists at the 1928 Summer Olympics
Cyclists from Warsaw